Withymoor Goods Yard was a railway goods yard situated in Netherton, West Midlands, England. It opened in 1879 at the termination of a branch line which connected it with the newly opened Bumble Hole Line.

Closure
The goods yard closed in 1964, as a result of the Beeching Axe, though the Bumble Hole Line remained open until 1968.

The site today

Industrial use
The site of the goods yard was developed for industrial use during the 1990s, some 30 years after the cessation of railway activity.

Footpath
A short length of the former line is now a footpath linking Netherton Park with Northfield Road. The Greaves Road bridge over the former line still stands at the edge of Netherton Park.

References

External links
Rail around Birmingham and the West Midlands: Withymoor goods yard

Rail transport in Dudley